Facid can refer to:
 Facid, a trade name for Famotidine
 Faculdade Integral Diferencial, a university in Teresina